Albino Simões Neto (29 July 1923 – before 2014) was a Portuguese rower. He competed at the 1948 Summer Olympics and the 1952 Summer Olympics.

References

External links
 
 

1923 births
Year of death missing
Portuguese male rowers
Olympic rowers of Portugal
Rowers at the 1948 Summer Olympics
Rowers at the 1952 Summer Olympics
Place of birth missing